This list contains an overview of the government recognized Cultural Properties of the Philippines in Northern Mindanao. The list is based on the official lists provided by the National Commission on Culture and the Arts, National Historical Commission of the Philippines and the National Museum of the Philippines.

|}

See also
List of historical markers of the Philippines in Northern Mindanao

Northern Mindanao
Cultural Properties
Buildings and structures in Mindanao